The Five-Year Engagement is a 2012 romantic comedy film written, directed, and produced by Nicholas Stoller. Produced with Judd Apatow and Rodney Rothman, it is co-written by Jason Segel, who also stars in the film with Emily Blunt as a couple whose relationship becomes strained when their engagement is continually extended. The film was released in North America on April 27, 2012 and in the United Kingdom on June 22, 2012.

Plot
In San Francisco, sous-chef Tom, and PhD graduate Violet, are happily engaged. Their wedding plans are interrupted when Tom's best friend Alex gets Violet's sister Suzie pregnant at Tom and Violet's engagement party, and Alex and Suzie quickly marry. When Violet is accepted into the University of Michigan's two-year post-doctorate psychology program, Tom agrees to move with her and delay their wedding, but is disheartened to learn his boss planned to make him a head chef.

Unable to find a suitable chef's position in Michigan, Tom is resigned to working at Zingerman's and takes up hunting with Bill, a fellow university faculty spouse. Violet settles into her new job under professor Winton Childs, working with Doug, Ming, and Vaneetha. A prank results in Violet being chosen to lead the team's research project, studying people who choose to eat stale donuts rather than wait for fresh donuts to arrive. Tom and Violet's nuptials are further delayed when Winton receives funding from the National Institutes of Health with Violet's help and extends her program. Tom is upset by the news, and he and Violet fight over his unhappiness with their new life.

As years pass, Tom becomes disillusioned and obsessed with hunting. Alex, Suzie, and their daughter Vanessa visit, and reveal Suzie is pregnant again. Tom responds that he no longer wants to have a child, surprising Violet, who offers to look after Vanessa with Tom, but the night turns into a disaster after Vanessa shoots Violet with Tom's crossbow. Tom's downward spiral becomes evident when Violet sees him eat a stale donut. At a bar with colleagues, a drunken Violet and Winton kiss, which Violet instantly regrets. She tells Tom that she wants to plan their wedding immediately, and he happily agrees. When Violet confesses to kissing Winton, Tom loses faith in their relationship, which reaches a climax when Winton comes to their rehearsal dinner to apologize. Tom chases Winton away and leaves to get drunk alone. He runs into Margaret, an amorous co-worker, but opts not to have sex with her, and wakes up half-naked in the snow with a frostbitten toe, which is amputated. Violet visits Tom at the hospital, and they call off their engagement once they arrive home.

Violet starts a relationship with Winton but often reminisces about Tom, who wishes her a happy birthday via email, including a video of Ming's ridiculous experiment on his friend Tarquin. Violet calls Tom, who has returned to San Francisco, working as a sous-chef under Alex and dating the hostess, Audrey. Their friendly-but-awkward conversation takes a turn as they argue over Violet's stale donuts experiment as a metaphor for their relationship, and both end the call upset. Realizing Tom's unhappiness, Alex fires him out of love, telling him that he is the better chef and should open his own franchise, and Tom launches a popular taco truck.

Violet receives an assistant professorship but learns she was hired because she is dating Winton, and breaks up with him. After lunch with his parents, Tom decides to win Violet back and breaks up with Audrey. He surprises Violet at her grandparent's funeral in England, and they agree to spend the remainder of the summer together in San Francisco, rekindling their relationship while sharing an apartment and working in the taco truck.

Driving Violet to the airport, Tom offers to take his truck to Michigan and continue their relationship. Violet proposes to Tom at the side of the road, just as he did five years before, and Tom reveals the ring he originally gave her, explaining that he was planning to re-propose at the airport. They head to Alamo Square, where Violet has organized their family and friends for an impromptu wedding. Tom chooses between Violet's various options for the officiant, clothing, and music, and they finally marry. Tom and Violet share their first kiss as a married couple, and the film flashes back to their first kiss when they first met at a New Year's Eve party. Alex and Suzie sing “Cucurrucucú paloma” on a carriage ride with the newly-wedded couple.

Cast

Production
Parts of the movie take place in Ann Arbor, Michigan, and scenes were filmed there and in nearby Ypsilanti in June 2011.

Music

The Five Year Engagement: Music From The Motion Picture is the soundtrack of the film. It was released on April 17, 2012 with Michael Andrews as composer and Jonathan Karp as Music Supervisor.

Release
The Five-Year Engagement debuted at number 5 in the box office. It grossed $11,157,000 on its first weekend in US and Canada. As of May 20, 2012 it has grossed $27,068,000 in U.S. and Canada and $4,700,000 in Australia and New Zealand bringing to a total of $31,768,000. The movie's budget was $30,000,000. As of June 21, 2012 its worldwide gross was $53,909,751. The film was released on 22 June in the UK. By August it had grossed $7,743,125 in the United Kingdom.

Reception
On Rotten Tomatoes the film has a score of 64% based on reviews from 179 critics, and an average rating of 6.2/10. The website's critical consensus reads, "While certainly overlong, The Five-Year Engagement benefits from the easy chemistry of its leads and a funny, romantic script with surprising depth and intelligence." On Metacritic the film has a score of 62 out of 100 based on 38 reviews, indicating "generally favorable reviews." Audiences surveyed by CinemaScore gave the film a grade B− on scale of A to F.

Owen Gleiberman Entertainment Weekly gave the film a grade of a B+ and called it "A lively, original, and scattershot-hilarious ramble of a Judd Apatow production." Elizabeth Weitzman, from New York Daily News wrote: "Blunt has never been more relaxed, and she and Segel have a believably warm chemistry." Richard Roeper gave the film a grade of a B+, saying that it featured a "winning cast in an uneven but often brilliant and weird comedy."

References

External links
 
 
 
 Davy Rothbart interviews Nicholas Stoller for Grantland

2012 films
2012 romantic comedy-drama films
2010s English-language films
2010s sex comedy films
American romantic comedy-drama films
American sex comedy films
Apatow Productions films
Films about weddings in the United States
Films directed by Nicholas Stoller
Films produced by Judd Apatow
Films scored by Michael Andrews
Films set in Michigan
Films set in San Francisco
Films shot in Detroit
Films shot in Michigan
Films shot in San Francisco
Films with screenplays by Jason Segel
Films with screenplays by Nicholas Stoller
Universal Pictures films
Relativity Media films
2010s American films